Rodney F. Pocceschi (September 9, 1969–June 23, 2003) was a 33-year-old Virginia Beach, Virginia police officer killed in the line of duty.  Pocceschi was making a routine traffic stop of what turned out to be suspects fleeing a robbery.

Background 
Pocceschi, a Pennsylvania native, was a 1992 graduate of Bloomsburg University, with a degree in criminal science.  After college he served with the Bloomsburg University Police Department and the Nescopeck Police Department.  He joined the Virginia Beach Police Department on August 2, 1999.

In 2001, Pocceschi received a special commendation for helping with a neighborhood project that focused on crime-ridden housing projects. At the time of the incident, he had just recently joined the department's special operations branch.

The incident 
On the evening of June 23, 2003, Christina Marie Tatem, an 18-year-old IHOP employee, let two men into the back door of the restaurant: her boyfriend and convicted felon LeKeith Devon Speller, 21, and his accomplice Shawn Anthony Zhe. The three put on masks and robbed the restaurant, which was open, though no customers were present. The two men fled and at 3:24am were pulled over for speeding by Pocceschi.

According to police reports, during the traffic stop Lekeith Devon Speller, 21, got out of the car and pulled a gun and shot at Pocceschi, who fired back. Both were wounded and collapsed; Zhe remained on the scene. A teenager saw Pocceschi lying in the road and stopped to help. He flagged down a K-9 officer, who with a second officer rendered CPR. Pocceschi died in the hospital at 4:05 a.m; this was the first felonious killing of a Virginia Beach police officer in 22 years.

Speller was pronounced dead at the scene.  It was discovered that he was a six-time convicted felon, who had convictions for violent crimes, and was at the time wanted for assaulting a police officer, burglary, grand larceny, and probation violation.  He was also the suspected accomplice in a pair of fast-food robberies and one murder only a month before Pocceschi's killing.

Pocceschi was survived by a wife and a nine-month old child.  A memorial fund yielded $44,000.

Fallen Officers Remembered 
Following his death, Pocceschi's sisters, Jaclyn Pocceschi-Mosley and Gina Pocceschi-Boyle, founded Fallen Officers Remembered, an organization that engages in charitable activities, such as providing scholarships for criminal justice students, and providing bulletproof vests to police officers who do not already have them.

References

1969 births
2003 deaths
Male murder victims
American police officers
Bloomsburg University of Pennsylvania alumni
People from Virginia Beach, Virginia
People murdered in Virginia
Deaths by firearm in Virginia
2003 murders in the United States